NTUC may mean:

 National Trade Unions Confederation, national trade union center in Mauritius. 
 National Trades Union Congress, a national trade union centre in Singapore.
 NTUC Downtown East, an entertainment hub located in Pasir Ris, Singapore.
 NTUC FairPrice, a Singaporean supermarket chain.
 National Trade Union Confederation (Cambodia), a trade union federation in Cambodia.
 Nepal Trade Union Congress, a national trade union center in Nepal.
 Nigeria Trade Union Congress, a former national trade union federation in Nigeria.